Two Japanese destroyers have been named Yukikaze :

 , a  launched in 1939 and ceded to the Republic of China in 1947 who renamed her ROCS Tan Yang. She was scrapped in 1970.
 , a  launched in 1955 and stricken in 1985

Japanese Navy ship names